The William H. Hatch House is a historic house at 306 Keystone Avenue Keystone Avenue in River Forest, Illinois. Grain trader William H. Hatch built the house for his family in 1882, early in the village's development and two years after its incorporation. The house has a Queen Anne style design, a popular choice both locally and nationally at the time. The design includes three spindlework porches, a tower at the southeast corner, and a shingled gable atop the front and rear facades. The emphasis on spindlework, while common in early Queen Anne designs, is unusual among examples of the style in River Forest.

The house was added to the National Register of Historic Places on September 5, 2007.

References

Houses on the National Register of Historic Places in Cook County, Illinois
Queen Anne architecture in Illinois
Houses completed in 1882
River Forest, Illinois